Danielle Peck is the self-titled debut studio album by American country music singer Danielle Peck. It was released on June 6, 2006, on Big Machine Records. Three singles from this album charted on the Hot Country Songs chart between 2005 and 2007. These were "I Don't" at No. 28, "Findin' a Good Man" at No. 16, and "Isn't That Everything" at No. 30.

Track listing

Personnel
Adapted from AllMusic:

 Mike Brignardello - bass
 Tom Bukovac - electric guitar
 Gary Burnette - electric guitar
 J. T. Corenflos - electric guitar
 Dan Dugmore - steel guitar
 Stuart Duncan - fiddle, mandolin
 Shannon Forrest - drums, percussion
 Larry Franklin - fiddle, mandolin
 Paul Franklin - steel guitar 
 Byron Gallimore - electric guitar
 Byron Hagen - keyboards
 Doug Kahan - bass
 Troy Lancaster - electric guitar
 Paul Leim - drums, percussion
 Chris Leuzinger - 12-string guitar, acoustic guitar
 Steve Nathan - keyboards
 Jimmy Nichols - keyboards
 Michael Noble - 12-string guitar, acoustic guitar
 Alison Prestwood - bass
 Steven Sheehan - 12-string guitar, acoustic guitar
 Harry Stinson - drums, percussion
 Bryan Sutton - 12-string guitar, acoustic guitar
 Lonnie Wilson - drums, percussion
 Glenn Worf - bass
 Jonathan Yudkin - fiddle, mandolin

Chart performance

Album

Singles

References

2006 debut albums
Big Machine Records albums
Danielle Peck albums
Albums produced by Jeremy Stover
Albums produced by Byron Gallimore